Brusa allardi is a butterfly in the family Hesperiidae. It is found in Angola, the Democratic Republic of the Congo (the north-east and Shaba), Burundi and northern Zambia.

References

Butterflies described in 1967
Hesperiinae